Send a Gorilla is a 1988 New Zealand comedy film directed by Melanie Read.

Synopsis
Valentine's Day is the busiest day in the year for three young women and their singing telegram service. Their Send A Gorilla Singing Telegram Company has started badly they are short-staffed and drowning in orders. The boss is missing, and one of the singers has lost her voice.

Cast

Reviews
 1988 Variety
 1994 The Women's Companion to International Film - "...the film has a lot of crazy energy..."
 2000 Reframing women: a history of New Zealand film - "...a feminist critique of the commercialisation of romance..."

Awards and nominations
 Nominated for 3 New Zealand Film and TV Awards
 1989 Montreal Women's Film Festival - Audience Choice - Second Place.

References

External links
 

1988 films
1980s New Zealand films
1980s English-language films
1980s films
1988 in New Zealand
Films set in New Zealand
Films shot in New Zealand
New Zealand comedy films